IHRA may refer to:

International Hot Rod Association
International Hotel & Restaurant Association
International Harm Reduction Association
International Holocaust Remembrance Alliance
Intersex Human Rights Australia